Demi-toilet refers to a style of dresses based on a small skirt that can be worn on formal occasions or in daily life. It is different from full dresses, such as evening dresses, dress suits, and wedding dresses due to having a skirt length of five centimetres below the knee. The demi-toilet style is suitable for a simple, casual look. For example, lace could be added to the bottom of the dress when attending banquets or decorated with flowers for an afternoon tea. The dress is lightweight and comfortable, and it is suitable for many ceremonial occasions, including cocktail parties, birthday parties, business meetings, dates, vacations, and weddings. The style used to serve as a symbol of reputation when well-designed dresses and luxurious accessories directly represented one's elevated status and authority.

Evolution 
In the 1920s, the demi-toilet first appeared at wine tastings. At that time, the dress was described as a skirt. It was a fashionable daytime outfit with long, loose, gem-coloured skirt straight to the knee and collocated by a small-cap, gloves and a small handbag. In 1926, Coco Chanel first displayed this skirt in Vogue and caught public attention with a black dress. This dress had only a small amount of diagonal decoration. Vogue magazine called it Chanel's "Ford T model car" and predicted the prototype of this modest dress would become essential clothing for all women.

At the end of the 1920s, the demi-toilet dress was still modelled after the daytime outfit, yet it had begun to enter its evolution.

During the 1930s and 1940s, all-day dresses became popular, and the demi-toilet reappeared. The dress was most often black, but other colours were also available. Silk and satin were the most commonly used fabrics, and the length was generally only to the knee. The rise of black dresses was mainly due to their straightforward appearance, making it a good office dress. Black dresses were also frequently embellished with various accessories, such as brooches and sequins. The dress was suitable enough to appear in evening activities like dance and cocktail parties. Moreover, as they were limited to the black-and-white photography techniques of the time, female stars usually wore black dresses in the movies to avoid the colour distortion of the dress in the film imaging. All of these factors enabled the demi-toilet dress to quickly become a symbol of women's freedom of movement, mind, and body at that time, giving people a carefree feeling.

After World War II, the return of soldiers from foreign countries caused the clothing of other nationalities and different fabrics to enter into Western society. The fashion scene changed considerably. The style of dress became more open, the length of the dress became shorter, the neckline became lower, the body was tighter, and the sleeves were removed. The post-war dresses became more eye-catching and glamorous with more reflective sequins and shiny embroidery. The mindset at the time was that a shiny dress was better.

In the late 1940s, Christian Dior introduced the word 'demi-toilet' to describe the dress. A slightly exaggerated hat, along with long elbow gloves, a small chain bag with a flash powder box, and shoes that matched the colour of the handbag were the most popular style at cocktail parties. This tradition continued into the 1960s.

In the 1960s, the colour became relatively lighter, and pastel, silver, and gold replaced black as the main colour of the dress. The decorations on the dress were reduced. Many people stayed home at night due to the decreasing popularity of cocktail parties, and by the end of the 1960s, more women started to wear a simple dress in daily life. Home-made dresses started to replace demi-toilet dresses with fancy decorations. However, the design of the dresses still followed the trend of the time.

In the 1970s, the casual style was born, and loose jumpsuits and pants replaced the dresses.

In the 1980s, after the casual trend, the demi-toilet once again became popular, usually with satin as the fabric and decorated with lace.

In the 1990s, the demi-toilet style increased in popularity. People started to wear it on formal occasions. For example, some Hollywood actresses wore it on the red carpet, and leaders wore it to give speeches to the public. Since then, fashion designers of various brands had re-launched a collection of demi-toilet dresses that had been ignored for several decades.

Modern characteristics 
Today, demi-toilet dresses are a must-have for many fashion brands. Significant changes in the style of the dress through history have evolved into a variety of styles that are emerging today. These kinds of dresses lead the fashion trend and allow girls to have many different dresses. The demi-toilet brings women not only noble temperament and elegant femininity, but also a symbol of taste and status, which is popular among women.

Nowadays, the style of the demi-toilet is very diverse. Some styles include court retro, ethnic style, rock style, and civilian fashion. These styles are all novel and unique. The type of skirt on the dress also varies widely, with suspender skirts, slanted skirts, mini skirts, fishtail skirts, and pleated skirts all making appearances, along with many others. Materials such as chiffon, cotton, lace, silk, wool, linen, satin, denim, and leather may be used.

Style categories

Princess pattern 
The princess dress has many different styles, such as a tube top and a sling. These dresses are closely fitted to the waistline, which is unbroken by a seam. The dress gets its name from its resemblance to the stereotypical dress of a princess. Layers of chiffon and pettiskirts are the main characteristics. The high-waist design and fashionable details of the princess dress fit the proportions of many girls' bodies, especially petite and thin women. Nowadays, to keep simplicity, the princess dress eliminates the cumbersome feeling of layered skirts and brings a sense of ease and romance. Different necklines are also popular, giving a full-bodied bride a choice between a deep neckline or V-neck to make the neck look slimmer.

Crinoline pattern 
This type of dress is representative of decent elegance and strays from fashion trends. A tight waist, proper upper body, and cotton dress lining are the main characteristics. The exquisite design of the crinoline dress reflects the feeling of the nobility, and the large skirt makes women seem more solemn. In the British royal family, some dresses have had a history of several hundred years and were passed down from generation to generation Many may even be treated as a cultural relic.

Personal pattern
The personal dress is often simple, using draping fabric and a narrow design tailored to the body curve. Among all the patterns, it can best reflect the body shape of women and the modern style of cutting. The personal pattern dress may be the most similar to the types of skirts people wear today. It has many characteristics dependent on different designs, such as highlighting the neckline and adding glamour, femininity, and elongating the proportions of the upper body and legs. Unique tailoring methods make women high and thin visually and enable them to show their figures more confidently.

Colour

Beige
The beige demi-toilet is a perfect interpretation of classical and modern, considered to be elegant and fashionable as well as holding aristocratic traits. In addition, beige can give others a gentle and benignant feeling. This kind of dress is excellently designed, with attention to detail, unique materials, and high quality. Its design concept incorporates neoclassicism and expresses noble tastes with simplicity.

Black
Black is probably the most suitable colour for all to wear on every occasion. It uses a simple and elegant style to convey feelings of solemnity, stability, seriousness, loneliness and seniority. The black demi-toilet presents a charming, style—noble, self-cultivating, capable and generous.

Blue 
Blue demi-toilets give an impression of nobility and maturity. Blue is often considered a universal colour and may represent a calm demeanour. At the same time, the many shades of blue allow these dresses to take on several other meanings, such as vitality or success.

Green 
Green dresses can give off a mysterious, confident air. These dresses are often elegant and somewhat bold, as green is an eye-catching colour. However, green is also considered to be a neutral colour, making it popular among those who want to wear a unique dress without being too distracting.

Pink 
Pink is the most popular dress colour among girls and teenagers. It represents a cute, gentle, innocent, elegant and noble demeanour. Deep pink shows kindness and gratitude, while light pink shows a more tender and beautiful image. Pink also reminds many of love, which contributes to its popularity among younger girls.

Purple 
After 1862, when Queen Victoria wore a silk gown dyed with purple to the Royal Exhibition, the purple dress quickly became fashionable. However, at that time, only the aristocracy and the wealthy could afford to wear purple clothing because of the expensive dye. Purple is a mysterious and impressive dress colour. It may give a sense of oppression or inspiration. Dark purple dresses give a sense of terror, whereas dresses in light purple can leave others with an impression of a calm and modest individual. The vast differences between shades make purple a very unique dress colour.

White
When first meeting someone, a white demi-toilet may not be the preferred choice, as it may convey an impression of indifference. However, some specialists think that white has a calming effect on irritability. A pure white dress is different from those that are a more ordinary shade of white. A high-quality, bright white dress can be elegant and eye-catching. It has smooth lines, a simple style, and no exaggerated natural shape. The sophisticated craftsmanship, decent cuts, and precious fabrics of the white demi-toilet bring charm to many women. With different neckline designs, this dress can give a stylish, positive, transcendental, and progressive image, reflecting that of a romantic lady.

Yellow 
Yellow is a bright and light colour and shows clear, refreshed, innocent and friendly characteristics. A yellow dress might be chosen by a girl who is very optimistic about life, always looks forward, likes new things, and is eager to change her life frequently. Wearing yellow can also be a manifestation of spoiled psychology and a strong desire to win the favour of others. Yellow can represent frankness, straightforwardness and enterprise.

References 

Dresses
Design history